Yangcheng County is a county in the southeast of Shanxi Province, China, bordering Henan Province to the south. It is under the administration of the prefecture-level city of Jincheng and located in the latter's southwest confines. It is home to the AAAAA-rated House of the Huangcheng Chancellor.

Administrative divisions

Climate

Popular culture
The movie Inn of the Sixth Happiness is based on the story of Gladys Aylward's missionary activities in the county.

References

External links
www.xzqh.org 
Photos of Yangcheng showing sites mentioned in 'The Small Woman' and the Inn of Eight Happinesses (2006)

 
County-level divisions of Shanxi